The 2019 Champion of Champions (also known as the 2019 ManBetX Champion of Champions for the purposes of sponsorship) was a professional snooker tournament that took place between 4 and 10 November 2019 at the Ricoh Arena in Coventry, England. It was the ninth Champion of Champions event, the first of which was held in 1978. The tournament featured 16 participants who had won World Snooker events throughout the prior snooker season. In 2019, the Women's World Champion competed at the tournament for the first time. As an invitational event, the Champion of Champions tournament carried no world ranking points.

Ronnie O'Sullivan was the defending champion having defeated Kyren Wilson 10–9 in the final of the 2018 event. O'Sullivan lost 5–6 to Neil Robertson in the semi-finals. Robertson defeated reigning world champion Judd Trump 10–9 in the final to win the championship, having required  in the penultimate frame to avoid losing the match. There were 20 century breaks during the tournament, eight of which were made in the final. Mark Allen compiled the highest break of the tournament, a 140, in his semi-final loss to Trump. The tournament's total prize fund was £440,000, the winner receiving £150,000.

Format
The Champion of Champions is an invitational snooker tournament, first held in 1978, and annually since 2013. As an invitational event, it does not carry any world ranking points. The 2019 Champion of Champions took place from 4 to 10 November 2019 at the Ricoh Arena in Coventry, England. It featured 16 winners of events from the previous 12 months on the World Snooker Tour. The World Women's Snooker Championship and the World Seniors Championship were added to the list of eligible events for 2019, the winners of these two championships being allowed to participate in the Champion of Champions for the first and second time, respectively, (Steve Davis as reigning World Seniors Champion qualified for the 2014 Champion of Champions). The tournament was organised by Matchroom Sport, broadcast on ITV4 and sponsored by sports betting company ManbetX.

The 16 qualifiers were split into four groups of four players; each group competed on a different day, with the group finals (event quarter-finals) played on the same day as the corresponding first-round matches. The two semi-finals were played on separate days – 8 and 9 November – with the final on 10 November. The length of the matches varied throughout the competition, those in the opening round being best-of-7 , group finals and semi-finals best-of-11 frames, and the two-session final played as a best-of-19-frames match. Ronnie O'Sullivan automatically qualified for the event as reigning champion, having defeated Kyren Wilson in the 2018 Champion of Champions final 10–9.

Prize fund
The event featured a prize fund of |£440,000, an increase of £70,000 over the 2018 Champion of Champions tournament. The winner's prize money was increased from the previous year by £50,000, to £150,000. The breakdown of prize money for the 2019 event was:

 Winner: £150,000
 Runner-up: £60,000
 Semi-final: £30,000
 Group runner-up: £17,500
 First round loser: £12,500
 Total: £440,000

Qualification
Qualification for the 2019 Champion of Champions event was determined by the winners of 26 tournaments over a one-year period, from the 2018 Champion of Champions to the 2019 World Open, thereby including tournaments from both the 2018–19 and 2019–20 snooker seasons. The tournaments were placed into six groups dependent on the size of the event, with the previous year's Champion of Champions and the Triple Crown events listed in the first group, and tournaments in the same group were listed chronologically. The winners of the first 16 tournaments on the list were guaranteed a place in the championship. In the event of any of these players meeting multiple qualification criteria, the winners of subsequent tournaments on the list (in the order shown below) would be offered a place in the Champion of Champions. Judd Trump qualified for the event by winning six of the first 16 tournaments, the most won by any player.

{|class="wikitable" span = 50 style="font-size:85%;
|-
|style="background:lightgrey": #cfc;" width=10|
|Player had already qualified by winning a previous event
|}

Summary
The event featured 16 participants, split into four groups of four players. There were eight seeded players, based on the world snooker rankings, and each of the top four seeds was placed into a separate group. As defending champion, Ronnie O'Sullivan was seeded first, world champion Judd Trump second, Mark Selby third and Neil Robertson fourth. Each group was played over the course of a single day as single-elimination, rather than a round-robin competition.

Group stages

The championship began on 4 November 2019, with players from group four competing in the first round. The opening match was between Neil Robertson and 2019 Championship League winner Martin Gould. Robertson defeated Gould 4–0, the highest  of the match being just 67. In the other group four match, 2019 China Championship winner Shaun Murphy played Reanne Evans, the 2019 World Women's Snooker champion. Speaking to the press before the match, Evans reflected that whilst it was an honour to play in the competition despite not being on the World Snooker Tour, there was still a disparity between the men's and women's games. She also commented that the prize money for appearing at the event was double that of any she had received before, despite having won the women's world championship on 12 occasions.

Murphy praised Evans afterwards, saying that he really hoped "we see more of Reanne on the main event". He also remarked later that the audience were supporting Evans and even his wife was "reluctant to wish [him] good luck today". Murphy and Robertson competed in the group four final. Murphy again took the first three frames of the match, before Robertson drew level at 3–3 after a break of 100 and two breaks of 90 plus. The two players shared the next four frames, both experiencing issues with the table , to tie the match at 5–5. Robertson took the deciding frame to win 6–5.

The group three matches were played on 5 November, three-time world champion Mark Selby defeating first-time ranking event winner Yan Bingtao 4–0. The 2018 Scottish Open winner Mark Allen defeated the 2019 Indian Open winner Matthew Selt in the other group three first-round match. In the group three final, Allen recovered from 1–2 behind to defeat Selby 6–2. The group two matches, played on 6 November, featured a first-round encounter between the reigning world champion Judd Trump and the six-red and World Cup winner Stephen Maguire. Trump won the first two frames of the match, Maguire scoring just four points. Trump also took frames three and four, making three breaks of over 50, to win the match 4–0. Trump won the first four frames of the match, scoring two centuries;  won frame five but Trump then pulled ahead to 5–1. After  replied with breaks of 61 and 66, Trump took the ninth frame to win the match 6–3.

The group one matches took place on 7 November. World number three Ronnie O'Sullivan played 2019 World Seniors Championship winner Jimmy White in the first match. White took the first three frames, before O'Sullivan won the next two. Two former world champions, John Higgins and Stuart Bingham, met in the other group one first-round match, which Higgins won 4–2. O'Sullivan defeated Higgins 6–3 in the group one final. O'Sullivan's  during the match was just 13 seconds per shot.

Knockout stages

The semi-finals were played as best-of-11-frames matches. The first semi-final was held on 8 November between Ronnie O'Sullivan and Neil Robertson. The pair had met in the finals of two events in the 2019 Coral Cup series—the Tour Championship and the Players Championship—with O'Sullivan winning on both occasions. The match was even throughout, with no more than one frame separating the two players. Robertson compiled a break of 108 in frame five to open up a 3–2 lead, O'Sullivan winning three of the next four frames to lead 5–4. Robertson won frame 10 with a break of 135, the highest of the tournament at that point, to force a deciding frame. Robertson later commented that the match was "definitely one of the best matches [he had] been involved in".

Mark Allen and Judd Trump met in the second semi-final on 9 November. Trump won the first three frames of the match, but Allen took the next four, including the tournament's highest break of 140, to lead 4–3. With a break of 98 in frame 10, Trump won the match 6–4.

The final between Trump and Robertson was played as a best-of-19-frames match over two sessions on 10 November. The referee for the final was Desislava Bozhilova. Robertson won the first two frames of the match, including a break of 112 in the second frame, and took an early 3–1 lead. Trump then made three consecutive centuries in frames five to seven, totalling 367 points without reply, to go ahead 4–3. Breaks of 96 and 111 gave Robertson the next two frames to retake the lead at 5–4 between the two sessions.

Trump took the first frame of the second session, but Robertson replied with a break of 104. Trump won the next two frames to go ahead 7–6, and retained the lead until Robertson made a break of 135 in the 16th frame to tie the match at 8–8. Trump required foul shots from his opponent to win frame 17, and went ahead once again. He then made a break of 137 in the deciding frame to win the match 10–9. This was Robertson's second Champion of Champions victory, having won the event in 2015. He later commented: "I can't believe the pair of us playing a match like that. It's the best match I've ever been involved in". With a total of eight century breaks (five of which were compiled by Robertson), the final included a record number of centuries for a best-of-19-frames match. There were 784,000 viewers on ITV4 across the two sessions of the final. This was the second-highest non-terrestrial viewing figure in the United Kingdom for the day, behind a Premier League football match between Liverpool F.C. and Manchester City F.C. on Sky Sports.

Main draw
Below is the main draw for the event. Numbers in brackets show the four seeded players. Players in bold denote match winners.

Final

Century breaks
A series of 20  were made during the competition. Mark Allen made the highest break of the tournament, a 140 in frame five in his semi-final match against Judd Trump.

 140, 108, 106  Mark Allen
 137, 135, 135, 112, 111, 108, 104, 100  Neil Robertson
 130  Shaun Murphy
 128, 127, 121, 119, 114, 102  Judd Trump
 104  Ronnie O'Sullivan
 102  Kyren Wilson

References

External links
 

2019
2019 in snooker
2019 in English sport
Sports competitions in Coventry
2010s in Coventry
Champion of Champions